The campus of  the George Washington University (GW), originated on College Hill, a site bounded by 14th Street, Columbia Road, 15th Street and Florida Avenue, NW in the Columbia Heights neighborhood of Washington, D.C.  After relocating to the downtown financial district in the 1880s and then to Foggy Bottom in 1912, GW now has three campuses.  Foggy Bottom is the location of the university's main campus in Washington, D.C. Also in Washington's Foxhall neighborhood is the Mount Vernon Campus, formerly the Mount Vernon College for Women. Additionally, the George Washington University Virginia Campus is located in Ashburn, VA.

Foggy Bottom
Barring a few outlying buildings, the boundaries of campus are delineated by Pennsylvania Avenue, 19th Street, E Street, and Virginia Avenue. The University owns much of the property in Foggy Bottom and leases it to various tenants, including the World Bank and the International Monetary Fund. Other nearby institutions include the Harry S. Truman Building (Department of State headquarters), John F. Kennedy Center for the Performing Arts, United States Institute of Peace, Watergate complex, and the embassies of Saudi Arabia, Mexico, Spain, Uruguay, and Bosnia and Herzegovina.

Residence Halls

Places

Midcampus is a central area of the main campus located between 21st & 22nd Streets and G & H Streets. There are three 'gated' entrances to Midcampus located on 21st, 22nd, and H Streets. Kogan Plaza, located at the Trustees Gate on H Street, is used as a gathering place for students, for social purposes, demonstrations, barbecues, or student organization fairs, among other purposes. Kogan is surrounded by Lisner Auditorium, Gelman Library, and other buildings. It sits across H Street from the District House residence hall (formerly 'Schenley' and 'Crawford' residence halls), as well as the Marvin Center.  The Monroe Court is a landscaped area with cherry trees and a central fountain, located near Hall of Government and Monroe Hall, just off Midcampus Walk.

Lisner Auditorium is located on the southwest corner of 21st and H Streets. Since the 1940s, 'Lisner' has been the site of many events. Before the Kennedy Center opened, it was a major center of DC theater life. Lisner is listed on the National Register of Historic Places. South of Lisner is the Margaret Wetzel House, home to the University Honors Program.

University Yard, the historic heart of The George Washington University, is a large green space that is open at its north end to H Street, between 20th and 21st Streets. Like Kogan Plaza, University Yard is used for purposes such as a gathering place for students, for social purposes, demonstrations, barbecues, or student organization fairs, among others. On the eastern edge, along 20th Street, are George Washington University Law School buildings, including Stockton Hall, Theodore Lerner Hall and the Jacob Burns Law Library.  On the south side of the Yard are Art Deco landmarks Stuart Hall, Lisner Hall and Bell Hall. Along the western edge of University Yard are Corcoran and Samson Halls, as well as the Woodhull House, which houses the University Police Department. Corcoran and Stockton Halls, as well as Woodhull House, are listed on the National Register of Historic Places.

The southeast corner of campus features the area that is the furthest east, with an assortment of GW buildings on 19th Street. Additionally the Elliott School of International Affairs building is the building that is furthest south on campus, located on E Street. Elliott School classes and administrative offices are located in the 1957 E Street section of the building that occupies the block of 19th to 20th Streets. Also in this building is the 1959 E Street residence hall for upperclassmen that features a Starbucks and Subway at its base. Across from the Elliott School are the public Rawlins Park and various government buildings, including the General Services Administration, the Interior Department, and the State Department's headquarters, Harry S. Truman Building. On 19th Street are Mitchell Hall and Thurston Hall residences. 'Mitchell' houses a 7-11 at its base. 

At the corner of 19th and F Streets is Thurston, also across from an International Monetary Fund building. Thurston is the largest freshman residence hall at the university. Located next to Thurston on F Street, heading west, are the Alumni House, which is listed on the National Register of Historic Places, and the Career Center at the Old Main building. Also on the National Register and across the street is the 1925 F Street Club, which today serves as the President's Residence. Behind the President's residence is the historic Concordia German Evangelical Church and Rectory. Across 20th Street from the President's Residence is also Francis Scott Key Hall, a sophomore residence. 

Adjacent to 'FSK' is Potomac House, or 'Potomac', heading west on F Street. Potomac is a newer freshman residence hall. Next to Potomac is a packaging services and post office building. Building JJ, a small residence hall, stands next-door, as well as a fraternity townhouse on the 21st Street corner. Along the south side of F Street between 20th and 21st Streets are a collection of non-university apartment buildings that house many students who choose not to live in university housing.

In the northwest corner of the Foggy Bottom campus is McDonaldsWashington Circle. Next to Washington Circle is the George Washington University Hospital. New Hampshire Avenue and Pennsylvania Avenue lead into the circle, as does 23rd Street. South of the hospital is the Foggy Bottom - GWU Metro Station. The station serves the Blue and Orange Lines, which provides students with a direct line to Capitol Hill, among other popular stations. From the Washington Circle area of campus, it is the shortest walk to Georgetown, and also Dupont Circle. 

Further south on 23rd Street is the Lerner Health and Wellness Center, also known as HelWell, on the 23rd and H Streets northwest corner. HelWell features a gym, a three-lane lap swimming pool, a suspended jogging track, basketball courts, two gymnasia, four racquetball courts, six squash courts, and other facilities. It sits across the street from the Ivory Tower and Townhouse Row residences.

Behind Townhouse Row, between F and G Streets, is the Charles E. Smith Athletic Center, on 22nd Street.  The 'Smith Center' is a 5,000 seat multipurpose arena that is home to Colonials basketball games, commencement exercises, orientation exercises, and entertainment events. The Smith Center is currently undergoing an inside and out renovation.

Additional places and buildings on the Foggy Bottom campus include the Marvin Center, Hillel, 2000 Pennsylvania Avenue, Tonic, the UPD Headquarters, the Newman Catholic Center, and the GW Hatchet Building.

Academic Buildings
1957 E Street/Elliott School building, Media and Public Affairs Building, Estelle and Melvin Gelman Library, Monroe Hall, Hall of Government, Rome Hall, Philips Hall, Smith Hall, Corcoran Hall, Samson Hall, Bell Hall, Lisner Hall, Lerner Hall, Stuart Hall, Stockton Hall, Duquès Hall, Norma Lee and Morton Funger Hall, Tompkins Hall, Ross Hall, Himmelfarb Library, Burns Law Library, Law Learning Center, Science and Engineering Hall, Milken Institute School Building, Burns Law Clinic, Old Main, Staughton Hall, GSHED Building, 801 21st St, 2020 K St., 1776 G St, GW Museum, Corcoran College Building, Woodhull House.

Mount Vernon

Residence Halls

Facilities & Academic Buildings

Ashburn

Notes

External links
Official website
Foggy Bottom Campus Map
The GW and Foggy Bottom Historical Encyclopedia

Foggy Bottom
George Washington University
George Washington University
George Washington University
ar:جامعة جورج واشنطن
cs:George Washington University
de:George Washington University
es:Universidad George Washington
fr:Université George Washington
ka:ჯორჯ ვაშინგტონის უნივერსიტეტი
nl:George Washington-universiteit
ja:ジョージ・ワシントン大学
no:George Washington University
pt:Universidade George Washington
fi:George Washingtonin yliopisto
zh:喬治華盛頓大學